Sewan puja Some times Banshakti thaan Puja। बनशक्ति देवता पुजा। is a kind of puja in Hindu culture of banghushree where peoples of this village gathered on specific holy place and sacrifice the life of goat or cock in believing that God of forest will provide security to their cattles. They also believe that worshiping this way causes rain in time. According to Sharad Puri, a graduate student of physics from there, Peoples of this village has formed a committee for its management. All the peoples have great faith on this holy function. They have planted on a bare land and registered in government as a community forest with name Banshakti samudayik ban to show their respect towards forest.

Sewan puja is a symbol of respect of human to the other animals and plants. This puja starts each year right before monsoon season. According to the culture of banghushree,  heads of worshiped goats and cocks  are provided to Gurra (गुर्रा) who reads mantra while worshiping.

See also
Animal sacrifice in Hinduism

References

Puja (Hinduism)